Aruba's national flag was adopted on 18 March 1976. The design consists of a field of light blue (called "United Nations Blue"), two narrow parallel horizontal yellow ("Bunting Yellow") stripes in the bottom half, and a four-pointed white-fimbriated red ("Union Flag red") star in the canton. The flag was designed in part by vexillologist Whitney Smith.

Description
The four colors and symbols each have significance:

 Light Blue signifies the sea that's surrounding the island of Aruba. The specific background color in the Pantone Matching System is PMS 279 C, also known as the Larkspur blue.
 Yellow is the color of abundance and the horizontal lines represent abundance of solidarity. They also represent Aruba's economy past and present. Aruba's main past industries consisted of Gold and Aloë Vera and present main income comes from tourism. Yellow also stands for the local flora that blossom yellow flowers like: “Kibrahacha” Tabebuia billbergii, “Palo di Brazil" Haematoxylon brasiletto, “Bonchi di Strena” Parkinsonia aculeata, “Curahout” Peltophorum acutifolium, “Tuturutu” Yellow Dwarf Poincianas, Caesalpinia pulcherrima and “Wanglo” Puncture vine Tribulus cistoides. The horizontal yellow stripes symbolizes Aruba's freedom and separate position it has within the Kingdom of the Netherlands since 1 January 1986.
 White stands for peace and symbolizes the beaches as well as the purity of the hearts of Aruban people who strive for justice, order and liberty.
 The red star represents the four points of the compass and symbolizes the different origins of the Aruban population that attracted people from all over the world. It also stands for Aruba itself surrounded by the beautiful blue sea and ancient industry of "Palo di Brazil" Haematoxylon brasiletto. Red signifies love and also as a homage for the indigenous Arubans, that died at Frenchman's pass during a confrontation with the French for the liberty of the island. Red is the Union Jack Red.

March 18 is a public holiday in Aruba, known as National Anthem and Flag Day, and is celebrated through local events across the island. It is also considered the day the Kingdom of the Netherlands accepted Aruba's right to an autonomous status.

Governor's standard
There is also a standard for use by the Governor of Aruba in his capacity as representative of the Monarch of the Netherlands. It consists of a white field, with the flag of the Netherlands striped across both the top and the bottom, and a circular version of the flag of Aruba in the centre.

See also
Coat of arms of Aruba

References

External links
 Blue color in Aruba's flag PMS 279 C  on the Aruba Tourism Authorities website www.aruba.com Flag of Aruba 
 Government of Aruba website in Papiamento Gobierno di Aruba

Beaches of Aruba
National symbols of Aruba
National flags
Flags of the Netherlands
Flags introduced in 1976